Trevor Bedford is an American computational virologist at Fred Hutchinson Cancer Research Center.

Education and career 

Bedford graduated with a BA in Biological Sciences from the University of Chicago in 2002 and obtained a Ph.D in Biology from Harvard University in 2008.

In 2020, he posted on Twitter about the first known community transmission of COVID-19 in the United States. That action was later cited as one of the actions that helped galvanize a rapid response to Covid on a national scale.

In September 2021, he received a 7-year $9 million grant from the Howard Hughes Medical Institute. Later that same month he was named as part of that year's MacArthur Fellows Program class.

Selected publications

References

American virologists
MacArthur Fellows
Harvard Graduate School of Arts and Sciences alumni
University of Chicago alumni
Year of birth missing (living people)
Living people